Franco Ferreiro and André Sá were the defending champions but Sá decided not to participate.
Ferreiro plays alongside Marcelo Demoliner but lost in the first round to Jozef Kovalík and José Pereira. Kovalík and Pereira went on to reach the final but lost to Fernando Romboli and Júlio Silva 5–7, 2–6.

Seeds

Draw

Draw

References
 Main Draw

Aberto de Sao Paulo - Doubles
2012 Doubles
2012 in Brazilian tennis